Fortress Explorations (フォートレス・エクスプレーション) is a walk-through attraction at Tokyo DisneySea.

Summary
This fortress-themed attraction locates on the west side of Mediterranean Harbor. Within the attraction guests can walk around freely. Three restaurants ("Magellan's", "Magellan's Lounge", "Refrescos") in located inside of this attraction.

On July 7, 2008, an exploration-type new program called "The Leonardo Challenge" started. Guests receive the map and rely on it to find a "lava control station" somewhere in the attraction; however, a variety of trials await them before arrival.

This attraction is set as a fortress of a fictional society called S.E.A. (Society of Explorers and Adventurers). Though this fictional society was created for this attraction, S.E.A. can be found in many Disney Parks attractions around the world such as Mystic Manor in Hong Kong Disneyland, Big Thunder Mountain Railroad in Magic Kingdom, Oceaneer Lab in Disney Cruise Line and Miss Adventure Falls in Disney's Typhoon Lagoon, since those rides are related to S.E.A. society.

In other media
Two adaptations of the Society of Explorers and Adventurers are in development at Disney: a Disney+ series developed by Ronald D. Moore, and a feature film written by Qui Nguyen. The two projects are unrelated to each other.

References

External links
Fortress Explorations at Tokyo DisneySea

Tokyo DisneySea
Mediterranean Harbor (Tokyo DisneySea)
Walt Disney Parks and Resorts attractions
Amusement rides introduced in 2001
2001 establishments in Japan